James Fox (born 19 November 1945) is a British journalist best known for his book White Mischief, and for co-authoring Life, the best-selling memoir of Rolling Stones' guitarist Keith Richards.

Life and career 

Fox was born in Washington, D.C., U.S. and worked as a journalist in Africa as well as  reporting for London's Sunday Times.  His first book White Mischief is an account of the Happy Valley murder case in Kenya in 1941. He researched the book with Cyril Connolly in 1969 and it was later adapted into a film by Michael Radford in the 1980s. Fox also wrote The Langhorne Sisters, also known as Five Sisters: The Langhornes of Virginia.

He married the fashion designer Bella Freud in 2001. They have a son, James "Jimmy" Lux Fox. The couple had separated in 2017.

Bibliography

Books

Essays and reporting

References

External links
 James Fox Official Publisher's Page

1945 births
Living people
Freud family